Amazonas Province may refer to:

 Amazonas Province (Brazil), 1850–1889
 Amazonas Province (Venezuela), 1856–1860, one of the provinces of Venezuela

See also 
 Amazonas (disambiguation)

Province name disambiguation pages